Charles Edgar Redman (born December 24, 1943, in  Waukegan, Illinois) is a former United States diplomat. From 1987 to 1989, he was Assistant Secretary of State for Public Affairs.  He served as United States Ambassador to Sweden from 1989 to 1992, and United States Ambassador to Germany from 1994 to 1996. In 1996, he joined Bechtel Group, Inc. as senior vice president.  He graduated from the United States Air Force Academy and Harvard University.

References

Additional sources 
 Charles Edgar Redman on politicalgraveyard.com
 Bechtel Streamlines Organization, Announces Leadership Changes (June 1998)

External links

Ambassadors of the United States to Sweden
Ambassadors of the United States to Germany
Bechtel
1943 births
Living people
United States Department of State spokespeople
United States Air Force Academy alumni
Harvard University alumni
20th-century American diplomats